Nuno Velho Cabral or Travassos, (15th century) was a Portuguese nobleman, who served to the Kingdom of Portugal as conquistador and explorer. He accompanied his uncle Gonçalo Velho Cabral, in the voyage of discovery to Santa Maria and São Miguel Island, being one of the first settlers of Azores.

Biography 

Nuno was the son of Diogo Gonçalves de Travassos and Violante Alvares Cabral, a noble woman, daughter of Fernão Velho and Maria Alvares Cabral, great-aunt of Pedro Álvares Cabral. His wife was Africa Annes, daughter of Gonçalo Annes and Simôa de Sá, a distinguished family related to the first settlers of the Azores.

References 

15th-century Portuguese people
Portuguese nobility
Portuguese Roman Catholics